Grindstone Lake is a large freshwater lake located in Dell Grove Township, Pine County, in east-central Minnesota approximately  west of Sandstone, Minnesota. The lake has several small streams that drain the area wetlands and is considered the headwater for the Grindstone River. The lake's name is a translation from the Ojibwe zhiigwanaabikokaa-zaaga'igan (Lake abundant with grind stones). Sandstone taken from near the lake was used to make sharpening stones. The lake, North Fork Grindstone River and the lower course of the Grindstone River are depicted on the 1757 Mitchell Map.

Grindstone Lake is a popular resort area drawing cabin owners and visitors from the Minneapolis-St. Paul metropolitan area. It also features a sea plane base, a religious summer camp, and a nature education center.

See also
 Audubon Center of the North Woods

References

External links
Minnesota Department of Natural Resources information page for Grindstone Lake
Grindstone Lake Bible Camp
Grindstone Lake Seaplane Base (0MN2) information

Lakes of Minnesota
Lakes of Pine County, Minnesota